From South Africa to South Carolina is a studio album by the American vocalist Gil Scott-Heron and the keyboardist Brian Jackson. It was released in November 1975 by Arista Records. Scott-Heron performed "Johannesburg" and "A Lovely Day" on Saturday Night Live in December 1975. The album was reissued in the late 1990s via Scott-Heron's Rumal-Gia label, distributed by TVT Records.

The album peaked at No. 103 on the Billboard 200. "Johannesburg" was a moderate "disco" hit.

Production
The music was provided by the Midnight Band, led by Jackson.

Critical reception
The Houston Press, reviewing a reissue, wrote that the album's "best moments are the beautiful lament 'Beginnings', which is rife with bittersweet harmonies, and 'A Lovely Day', a light, poppish, medium-tempo number that builds to a smart climax." The Chicago Tribune thought that it was one of a handful of albums that "brought a new depth and political consciousness to the urban vision of the '70s." The Wire praised "Essex", calling the song "probably the most out thing this team ever tried: freeform intro, mordantly twining vocals, Jackson's darting, flickering flute."

Track listing
Side one
 "Johannesburg" 4:52
 "A Toast to the People" 5:47
 "The Summer of '42" 4:42
 "Beginnings (The First Minute of a New Day)" 6:23
Side two
 "South Carolina (Barnwell)" 3:45
 "Essex" 9:17
 "Fell Together" 4:30
 "A Lovely Day" 3:29

Bonus tracks
CD reissue bonus tracks
 "South Carolina (Barnwell)" (Live from the No Nukes concert at Madison Square Garden) 6:29
 "Save the Children" (Live from Blues Alley, Washington DC) 4:23
 "Johannesburg" (Live from Gil Scott-Heron: Black Wax) 11:14
 "Let Me See Your I.D." (from Sun City: Artists Against Apartheid) 7:30

Personnel
 Gil Scott-Heron - vocals, electric piano
 Brian Jackson - vocals, flute, keyboards, synthesizer
 Victor Brown - vocals, tambourine, bells
 Bilal Sunni Ali - saxophone, flute, harmonica
 Danny Bowens - bass
 Bob Adams - drums
 Charlie Saunders - congas, Chinese drum
 Barnett Williams - congas, djembe drums, shekere
 Adenola - congas

"Let Me See Your I.D." performed by Big Youth, Ray Barretto, Brian Jackson, Duke Bootee, Peter Garrett, Grandmaster Melle Mel and Gil Scott-Heron

References

Gil Scott-Heron albums
1975 albums
Albums produced by Perpis-Fall Music, Inc.
Arista Records albums
Spoken word albums by American artists
Collaborative albums